Varese Ligure is a comune (municipality) in the Province of La Spezia in the Italian region Liguria, located about  east of Genoa and about  northwest of La Spezia.

Varese Ligure borders the following municipalities: Albareto, Borzonasca, Carro, Maissana, Ne, Sesta Godano, Tornolo.

References

External links 
 Official website

Cities and towns in Liguria